Éric Justin Léon Zemmour (born 31 August 1958) is a French far-right politician, essayist, writer and former political journalist and pundit. He was an editor and panelist on Face à l'Info, a daily show broadcast on CNews, from 2019 to 2021. He unsuccessfully ran in the 2022 French presidential election, in which he placed fourth in the first round.

Born in Montreuil, Zemmour studied at Sciences Po. He worked as a reporter for Le Quotidien de Paris from 1986 to 1996. He then joined Le Figaro, where he worked until 2021. Zemmour appeared as a television personality on shows such as On n'est pas couché on France 2 (2006–2011) and Ça se dispute on I-Télé (2003–2014), as well as Zemmour et Naulleau (2011–2021), a weekly evening talk show on Paris Première, together with literary critic Éric Naulleau. Zemmour also worked for RTL from 2010 until 2019, first hosting the daily radio show Z comme Zemmour, prior to joining Yves Calvi's morning news show as an analyst. His book The French Suicide (Le Suicide français) sold more than 500,000 copies in 2014.

Zemmour is well known for his controversial views regarding immigration and Islam in France. He has extensively supported the idea of the "great replacement", a conspiracy theory contending that France's native population will be replaced by non-European people. Zemmour was fined for incitement to racial discrimination in 2011 and for incitement of hate against Muslims in 2018. He appealed the conviction before the European Court of Human Rights but he lost the appeal. He was acquitted six times of similar charges, in 2008, 2014 (twice), 2016, 2017 and 2019. Convictions in 2015 and 2020 were overturned on appeal.

Zemmour announced his candidacy for the 2022 French presidential election on 30 November 2021. On 5 December 2021, he launched Reconquête, a new political party. In 2021, a New York Times article described Zemmour's views as "hard-line... on immigration, Islam's place in France and national identity", while he self-identifies as Gaullist and Bonapartist. During his presidential campaign, Zemmour advocated vast changes in France's political system. He endorsed Marine Le Pen for the second round.

He was a candidate for a parliamentary seat in the Saint-Tropez-centred 4th constituency of the Var department in the 2022 French legislative election but was eliminated in the first round, placing third.

Life and career

Early life and family 
Zemmour was born on 31 August 1958 in Montreuil, at that time in the Seine department, now part of Seine-Saint-Denis. His parents were Berber Jews from Algeria, which was part of France at that time, and so they had French citizenship. They had moved to metropolitan France in 1952, before the Algerian War, alongside their parents and siblings. Upon their arrival in France, his paternal grandparents, born Liaou and Messouka, took the names Justin and Rachel, and his maternal grandmother, born Ourida, took her middle name Claire. Her husband was named Léon; this is the root of Zemmour's middle name.

His parents were Roger Zemmour, a paramedic, and Lucette, a housewife. His father was often absent and so he was principally raised by his mother and grandmother; he has since said that this helped him to forge his character, and that it was his mother who instilled in him drive and ambition for excellence. He has one younger brother, Jean-Luc.

Zemmour grew up first in Drancy and later in the Paris Château Rouge quarter. He was brought up in the Jewish faith, and he speaks Hebrew. Although private about his faith, he follows the directions of the Halakha and attended synagogues frequently until the death of his father in 2013. He has stated that his Jewish name is "Moïse".

Education 
Zemmour attended Jewish private schools, École Lucien-de-Hirsh and École Yabné. He graduated from the Institut d'études politiques de Paris in 1979. He subsequently failed twice (in 1980 and 1981) to gain admission to the École nationale d'administration (ÉNA). However, he later became member of the admissions committee of the school in 2006.

Personal life 
Since 1982, Éric Zemmour has been married to Mylène Chichportich, a lawyer of Tunisian Jewish descent who specialises in bankruptcy law. She maintains a low media profile and never comments on her husband's controversies. The couple have three children, two boys and a girl.

In 2021, Zemmour was alleged by French gossip magazines to have made his chief campaign advisor Sarah Knafo pregnant, although he recognised her as his partner in January 2022.

In a 2014 interview with Le Point, Zemmour stated that although he does not believe in God, he keeps a kosher home and occasionally attends synagogue services on High Holy Days.

Political journalist 

Zemmour began his career in 1986 on the politics desk at Le Quotidien de Paris, under the editorship of Philippe Tesson. After the newspaper went out of business in 1994, he became a lead writer at Info-Matin, where he stayed for a year. He joined Le Figaro in 1996 as a political journalist. During this period, Zemmour was also a freelancer for Marianne (1997) and for Valeurs actuelles (1999).

According to Libération, during the 1990s he called for a political union of the French right-wing parties, cultivating contacts with the founder and president of the National Front Jean-Marie Le Pen ("who Zemmour was unique amongst journalists in addressing as president") and his rival Bruno Mégret.

In 2009, he was moved by Le Figaro to Le Figaro Magazine, allegedly after making controversial statements in other media, but in fact, due to his salary being considered too high for his modest weekly output. He was moved back to Le Figaro as a permanent journalist in 2013, where he wrote regularly, including literary reviews, until he took time off work in September 2021 to promote his new book.

He was also a political columnist at Le Spectacle du Monde, a monthly publication by the Valeurs Actuelles group, from 2013 until it ceased publication in July 2014.A

Author 

Zemmour has written biographies of Prime Minister Édouard Balladur (Balladur, immobile à grands pas, or "Balladur, Motionless With Great Strides") and President Jacques Chirac (L'Homme qui ne s'aimait pas, or "The Man Who Did Not Like Himself") along with political essays. Notably, in 2006 he published Le premier sexe ("The First Sex"), a book on what he considers to be the feminisation of society. He worked on the screenplay for the film Dans la peau de Jacques Chirac by Michel Royer and Karl Zéro, although the latter stated that Zemmour's writing was only used to a limited extent. In 2008, he published Petit Frère, in a limited run of 63,000 copies, in which he criticised "antiracist angelism". In March 2010, with Mélancolie française ("French Melancholy") which won the Prix du livre incorrect, he considers alternate histories of France, if some events had not happened.

In 2014, Zemmour published Le Suicide français ("The French Suicide"), which sold over half a million copies and remains his best literary success to date. In it, he defends his thesis that the French nation-state has weakened since the 1970s, which he most notably attributes to the influence of the "May '68 generation".

In Destin français ("French Destiny"), published in 2018, he put events from his own life story in the context of various historical events. He once again addressed the history of France, as well as discussing the influence of Islam in France, which he sees as growing generally in French society.

His book La France n'a pas dit son dernier mot ("France Has Not Spoken Its Last Word"), released on 15 September 2021, made Zemmour an estimated €1.3 million in three weeks, according to Le Parisien, selling over 80,000 copies in the first four days and 165,000 copies in the first 3 weeks.

Television and radio personality 
Beginning in September 2003, he participated weekly on the show Ça se dispute on the 24-hour news channel i>Télé first alongside Christophe Barbier and later Nicolas Domenach. The channel decided to cancel the programme in December 2014, after Zemmour's comments on Islam in the Italian newspaper Corriere della Sera. The channel was later ordered to pay Zemmour €50,000 for wrongful breach of contract.

Zemmour also appeared on Vendredi pétantes on Canal+ until June 2006, and starting September 2006, he rejoined France 2 to participate on the show On n'est pas couché, hosted by Laurent Ruquier, accompanied by Michel Polac and then Éric Naulleau, where they were responsible for presenting honest criticism of films, books or most notably musical albums. During the show, their exchanges with cultural figures sometimes ended in clashes. On 27 May 2011, Ruquier announced in Le Parisien that he was replacing Zemmour and Naulleau with new contributors for the next season of On n'est pas couché.

Éric Zemmour was also a participant on the show L'Hebdo as an editorialist on Tempo, a channel for the overseas departments and territories; he was accompanied by, among others, sociologist Dominique Wolton. Finally, he was on the cable network Histoire on the show Le grand débat, hosted by Michel Field. Since 4 January 2010, he has presented a short piece on RTL entitled Z comme Zemmour every Monday and Friday, during which he presents topical news analysis. Since September 2011, he has hosted Zemmour et Naulleau alongside Éric Naulleau, an evening talk show on Paris Première. In 2021, Zemmour's show was receiving about 900,000 nightly viewers, ten times higher than in 2019.

In 2015, following the Charlie Hebdo shooting, Zemmour was temporarily placed under armed police protection. On 30 April 2020, Zemmour was insulted and threatened in Paris as he was walking by himself carrying bags of groceries. The incident was recorded by the perpetrator himself who posted the video on social media, boasting about his act as Zemmour was filmed ignoring the man and trying to walk away. Shortly thereafter, Zemmour received a phone call from President Emmanuel Macron in which they discussed the incident. The perpetrator, who later also recorded himself saying Zemmour is "too good at debate, what do you want to do except insult him", received a suspended prison sentence of three months on 8 September 2020. On 27 September 2021, Zemmour was again threatened in Paris, when a man shouted a death threat in the name of Islam. Since October 2020, he has again been under permanent armed police protection.

Candidacy in the 2022 presidential election 

The suggestion that Zemmour might stand in the 2022 French presidential election was first made in 2019, when no natural candidate emerged from the traditional right-wing parties. Zemmour then announced that he was thinking about "a platform of ideas for the right". The media also took notice of the presence in his entourage of Sarah Knafo, a political campaigner.

In 2021, he engaged in a national tour of France to promote of his new book, La France n'a pas dit son dernier mot. Appearing as a guest on France 2 on 11 September in Laurent Ruquier's On est en direct programme, Zemmour would not confirm whether he would announce his candidacy. He reiterated this position throughout September on RTL, BFMTV, CNews and LCI. On 28 September, Le Parisien revealed that Éric Zemmour already had at his disposal a large office space, in the 8th arrondissement of Paris, rented by the association "The Friends of Éric Zemmour".

On 24 September, Zemmour engaged in a widely publicized two-hour-long televised debate with left-wing presidential candidate Jean-Luc Mélenchon, attracting over 3.8 million viewers. On 30 November Eric Zemmour declared himself a candidate for the 2022 presidential election. On 5 December, he revealed his political party would be called "Reconquête". On 9 December 2021, Zemmour debated Bruno Le Maire on Elysée 2022, a presidential debate which was aired on France 2. During the debate, he said that the #MeToo is a movement of "eradication of men". Zemmour finished in fourth place during the first round of the 2022 election and was eliminated. He subsequently endorsed Marine Le Pen ahead of the second round.

Polls for the 2022 presidential election

The popularity of his candidacy has been tested in several polls since June 2021. The first time he appeared in a poll, in June 2021, the Institut français d'opinion publique (IFOP) credited him with 5.5% of the vote. In August 2021, he was credited with 7% of voting intentions according to Ipsos. On 14 September he was credited by Harris Interactive with 10% of voting intentions.

On 1 October 2021, with opinion polls showing him with 15% of voting intentions, putting him in third place overall, only 1 point behind National Rally candidate Marine Le Pen. Hence, he was in a potentially competitive position to reach the second round of the election. On 6 October, Zemmour reached 17% of voting intentions, in second place among all of the candidates for the first time, which, if realized, would have seen him reach the second voting round. Throughout October and November, before the confirmation of The Republicans' candidate, Le Pen and Zemmour were close in polls to come second behind Macron in the first round.

In December 2021, polls credited him with 12–14% of the vote, placing him fourth in the race, behind Macron, Valérie Pécresse (who had won the primary for The Republicans on 4 December) and Le Pen. In mid-January 2022, BBC correspondent Hugh Schofield commented following Zemmour's hate speech conviction that "in the last few weeks, Zemmour's star, which shone so brightly in the autumn, has shown distinct signs of fading. This verdict will entrench some in their support for the man. But it may also convince others that he is indeed beyond the pale".

Zemmour received notable endorsements from Philippe de Villiers, Jean-Marie Le Pen, Jacques Bompard, Jean-Frédéric Poisson, Jacline Mouraud, Paul-Marie Coûteaux, Jérôme Rivière, Guillaume Peltier, Joachim Son-Forget and Christine Boutin in the early stages of his campaign. In February 2022, Zemmour saw a resurgence in the polls, as he again rose to second place behind Macron.

Positions

Political orientation 

Zemmour identifies his political leanings as "Gaullo-Bonapartiste", a set of views inspired by Gaullism and Bonapartism. This has been defined in more concrete terms by the historian Nicolas Lebourg, who wrote that the Zemmour's politics are defined by four elements. Firstly, Bonapartism: Zemmour believes in the importance of "great men" in the fate of a country. Secondly, unitarism; a great importance is given to the unity of a nation state. Thirdly, "complete sovereignty": Zemmour believes that all of a nation's problems can be solved by the sovereignty of the nation state. The fourth element of Zemmour's ideas is a "nationalism obsessed with decadence" which would take the form of a sort of Darwinism: if the French people don't change, they will be "swept away by history".

Zemmour has been commonly presented as a "far-right pundit" in French and international media. Historian Laurent Joly wrote in 2015 that "since Barrès and Maurras, no other intellectual, journalist or writer has had this status as a broker of far-right ideas with a very large readership".

On the contrary, political scientist Jean-Yves Camus has opposed designating Zemmour as far-right, claiming that Zemmour was not a fascist or a Nazi. Asked in October 2021 on the positioning of Eric Zemmour in relation to Marine Le Pen, Camus ranks him "on the right", more precisely in the "radical conservative right". Some French media outlets also present him "on the right", in the "conservative right", or as Gaullist, or in the "sovereignist right", or in the "radical right", or in the "radical and identitary right".

Social issues 
Zemmour takes a conservative stance on social issues and has identified as a reactionary.

French decline 
Zemmour has expressed the view that the French nation-state has been in a state of decline since the 1970s, which he has attributed to the rise of immigration, feminism, left-wing politics and the erosion of traditional values. He presented these views at length in his 2014 essay The French Suicide. Zemmour has therefore been associated with declinism.

In a review of The French Suicide in The New Yorker, Alexander Stille argued that Zemmour significantly overstates the decline of France which, while no longer a great power, "remains among the top twenty countries by virtually all measures of the World Bank's Human Development Index."

Immigration and assimilation 
Zemmour has extensively promoted the Great Replacement conspiracy theory, contending that France's population will be replaced by immigrants.

Interviewed in August 2021 on his views on immigration in France, Zemmour declared: "We have to stop the flow. I'm not just talking about the illegals; I am thinking first of legal immigration. ... There is a process of replacing the population from the moment there are too many immigrants who no longer assimilate. It's inevitable."

A member of the French assimilationist tradition, Zemmour has strongly opposed mass immigration, and the current model of integrating immigrants which he considers to have been too lenient, for a long time. In November 2008, he gave an interview to the monthly Le Choc du mois where he compared immigration to a "demographic tsunami". In 2007 he also came out in favour of the Thierry Mariani amendment, which would require genetic tests in order to qualify for family reunification.

At a public meeting in Lille in October 2021, Zemmour reiterated his position on migrants, calling for an end to illegal and legal immigration in France.

Race and anti-racism issues 

Zemmour says he would like to put on trial the anti-racism of the 1980s, which he considers, along with feminism, to be a "bien-pensant cause" derived from the "milieu of French and Western pseudo-elites" that the people will not follow in the least. He says that it was especially after having "read Pierre-André Taguieff" who is known for his positions and work on the Nouvelle Droite and anti-racism that he "understood that anti-racist progressivism was the successor of communism, with the same totalitarian methods developed by the Comintern during the 1930s". According to him, anti-racism is a tactic initiated by François Mitterrand to make people forget the left's turn to economic liberalism in 1983. He claims that anti-racism is an ideology implemented by former leftists who had had to give up their illusions. With immigrants, these people had found a kind of alternative revolutionary people.

Feminism, women and homosexuality 
Zemmour has expressed criticism of feminism and homosexuality, and has claimed that France's decline had partly been caused by the erosion of virility, and the "feminization" of society, themes he has explored at length in Le Premier Sexe and The French Suicide. Zemmour called the legalization of abortion a "collective suicide" and has argued that women were unsuited to positions of political power. In The French Suicide, he expressed criticism of birth control, women's rights, and gender studies. He has also defended Dominique Strauss-Kahn and Tariq Ramadan in relation to accusations of sexual assault levelled against them.

A number of op-ed pieces have labelled his positions as misogynistic.

Zemmour defends himself from such allegations, stating that he instead believes himself to be "the greatest defender of women". In televised debates and during his presidential campaign he has often taken this position, arguing that he is the sole candidate to defend women from Islam, especially from the compulsion to wear veils under many modern interpretations of Sharia law.

Economic policy 
Zemmour's diagnosis of the current economic state of France precedes his positions on various economic issues, and in particular questions of fiscal policy and free trade. He says that France is "world champion in everything" in this regard, with 30% of GDP for social protection, 56% for public spending and 47% for compulsory contributions, such as direct taxes and various other social contributions. He also says that France's budget massively helps foreigners and immigrants, who benefit for example from 42% of the social redistribution of the national Family Allowance Fund. Zemmour declared in that regard that he will stop all kind of aid and subsidies to foreigners, and claims that this will bring 20 to 30 billion euros yearly savings to the French budget.
In particular, he also advocates abolishing state medical aid for foreigners, which costs 1 billion euros per year to the state budget.

Rather anti-liberal with regards to free trade, he opposes European federalism and the European Union, which he considers to be clearly in favour of the free movement of goods and in deep conflict with the French social model. According to him, because of the European Union, the left, like the right, must apply "the same economic policy, social liberalism or liberal socialism" because, in the words of Philippe Séguin, "right and left are retailers of the same wholesaler, Europe". Zemmour supports protectionism.

Taxes and social contributions 
Zemmour wants to lower corporate taxes. He has proposed to reduce the CSG (general social contribution) from 9% to 2.5%, for employees who have a modest salary, from the minimum wage up to 2,000 euros. Eric Zemmour thus judges that this would make a salary increase of a monthly minimum wage over the year. In order both not to reduce the social protection model of the French and to finance this tax cut, he wants "national solidarity to become national again", and has proposed that non-contributory social expenditure (family allowances, housing allowances, minimum old-age allowance, minimum living allowance) be withdrawn from foreigners and are reserved for the French. According to him, this represents 20 billion savings for the national budget.

Euro and free trade issues 
While Zemmour has advocated France dropping the Euro currency, he is no longer supporting this idea, which he believes would have more disadvantages than advantages at this stage. He rather prefers to concentrate on free trade issues, in order to stop free trade treaties, and introduce import taxes on strategic products where France needs to defend its national interest, local production, and social model.

Other topics 
 Zemmour has called the French state a "bureaucratic hell" and advocates administrative simplification.
 He proposes the retirement age be raised to 64.
 He regrets France abolished the death penalty and has expressed philosophical views in favour of it.

International relations 
Zemmour has argued for a distancing of France from the United States, a closer relationship with Russia, as well as an increased independence from the European Union and its foreign policy. He has stated that the Normandy landings during World War II had been a liberation, but also a "colonization", of France by the United States. Zemmour has also called for a strengthening of the French Armed Forces, arguing that the only influence that France has retained on the international scene was due to the strength of its armed forces and its nuclear defense capabilities. He supports a withdrawal from the NATO's integrated military command.

Zemmour supported Brexit and Britain's vote to leave the European Union, describing the EU as a "pure technostructure that has got rid of the people," but has said that he would not seek to fully withdraw France from the EU if elected president, arguing that France's war record made it harder for the country to follow Britain's example. Instead, Zemmour has summed up his position as "I want France to be in Europe, but I want France to come before Europe," and pledged to withdraw France from the EU's immigration and asylum policies, put French law above EU law and halt accession talks with Eastern European countries aiming to join the bloc.

In addition, Zemmour has expressed support for Rattachism, the integration of Wallonia, the French-speaking part of Belgium, into France, pointing to a 2010 opinion poll in which 49 per cent of Walloons were ready for such a move. He described Belgium as having become largely a fiction, and likened its separation from France to that of East Germany from West Germany, calling it "France's GDR".

Zemmour condemned Russia's 2022 invasion of Ukraine despite his previous pro-Russia stance.

Electoral History

2022 French Presidential Election 

|- style="background-color:#E9E9E9;text-align:center;"
! colspan="2" rowspan="2"| Candidate
! rowspan="2" colspan="2"| Party
! colspan="2"| 1st round  10 April 2022
! colspan="2"| 2nd round  24 April 2022
|-
! width="75"|Votes
! width="30"|%
! width="75"|Votes
! width="30"|%
|-
| style="background-color:;"|
| style="text-align:left;"| Emmanuel Macron
| style="text-align:left;"| La République En Marche!
| LREM
| 9,783,058
| 27.85
| 18,768,639
| 58.55
|-
| style="background-color:;"|
| style="text-align:left;"| Marine Le Pen
| style="text-align:left;"| National Rally
| RN
| 8,133,828
| 23.15
| 13,288,686
| 41.45
|-
| style="background-color:;"|
| style="text-align:left;"| Jean-Luc Mélenchon
| style="text-align:left;"| La France Insoumise
| LFI
| 7,712,520
| 21.95
|style="background-color:#F4F4F4;" colspan="2" rowspan="10"|
|-
| style="background-color:;"|
| style="text-align:left;"| Éric Zemmour
| style="text-align:left;"| Reconquête
| R!
| 2,485,226
| 7.07
|-
| style="background-color:;"|
| style="text-align:left;"| Valérie Pécresse
| style="text-align:left;"| The Republicans
| LR
| 1,679,001
| 4.78 
|-
| style="background-color:;"|
| style="text-align:left;"| Yannick Jadot
| style="text-align:left;"| Europe Ecology – The Greens
| EELV
| 1,627,853
| 4.63
|-
| style="background-color:;"|
| style="text-align:left;"| Jean Lassalle
| style="text-align:left;" | Résistons!
| RES
| 1,101,387
| 3.13
|-
| style="background-color:;"|
| style="text-align:left;"| Fabien Roussel
| style="text-align:left;"| French Communist Party
| PCF
| 802,422
| 2.28
|-
| style="background-color:;"|
| style="text-align:left;"| Nicolas Dupont-Aignan
| style="text-align:left;"| Debout la France
| DLF
| 725,176
| 2.06

|-
| style="background-color:;"|
| style="text-align:left;"| Anne Hidalgo
| style="text-align:left;"| Socialist Party
| PS
| 616,478
| 1.75
|-
| style="background-color:;"|
| style="text-align:left;"| Philippe Poutou
| style="text-align:left;"| New Anticapitalist Party
| NPA
| 268,904
| 0.77
|-
| style="background-color:;"|
| style="text-align:left;"| Nathalie Arthaud
| style="text-align:left;"| Lutte Ouvrière
| LO
| 197,094
| 0.56
|-
| style="background-color:#E9E9E9;" colspan="10"|
|- style="font-weight:bold"
| style="text-align:left;" colspan="4"| Total
| 35,132,947
| 100.00
| 32,057,325
| 100.00
|-
| style="background-color:#E9E9E9;" colspan="10"|
|-
| style="text-align:left;" colspan="4"| Valid votes
| 35,132,947
| 97.80
| 32,057,325
| 91.34
|-
| style="text-align:left;" colspan="4"| Blank ballots
| 543,609
| 1.51
| 2,233,904
| 6.37
|-
| style="text-align:left;" colspan="4"| Invalid ballots
| 247,151
| 0.69
| 805,249
| 2.29
|-
| style="text-align:left;" colspan="4"| Turnout
| 35,923,707
| 73.69
| 35,096,478
| 71.99
|-
| style="text-align:left;" colspan="4"| Not voted
| 12,824,169
| 26.31
| 13,655,861
| 28.01
|-
| style="text-align:left;" colspan="4"| Registered voters
| 48,747,876
| style="background-color:#F4F4F4;"|
| 48,752,339
| style="background-color:#F4F4F4;"|
|-
| style="background-color:#F4F4F4;" colspan="10"|
|-
| style="text-align:left" colspan="10"| Source: Minister of the Interior
|}

2022 French Legislative Elections 

 
 
 
|-
| colspan="8" bgcolor="#E9E9E9"|
|-

Controversies and conflicts with opponents 

The subjects Zemmour addresses, as well as the positions he defends, have earned him some strong opponents and equally strong supporters. According to an article by François Dufay, La fronde des intellos (literal translation: "The upheaval of the intellectuals"), in the June 2002 edition of Le Point, Jean-Marie Le Pen reportedly said that "[the] only three journalists who behave properly with respect to [him]" are Élisabeth Lévy, Éric Zemmour and Serge Moati. Zemmour noted during an interview: "I think he meant that with an ironic wink: it refers to his famous declaration fifteen years ago that caused such a scandal when he criticised Elkabbach, Levaï, who were all Jewish, and you will note that the three who he noted treat him well are also all Jewish. [...] And he knows that quite well, and everyone knows that quite well".

Following a number of controversies after a talk show on Arte dedicated to miscegenation on 13 November 2008, as a result of his comments on races (that blacks and whites belonged to two different races and that this difference was discernible by skin colour, without ranking them hierarchically), Zemmour also published a reply in the magazine Vendredi.
Faced with the criticism caused by the views expressed by Éric Zemmour during the show, the deputy manager of programmes for the Arte channel distanced himself from these words but explained that nothing said was illegal.

On 25 March 2009, he filed a complaint against the French rapper Youssoupha for "criminal threats and public abuse" after the uploading of the song "Because of saying it" in which Zemmour was attacked ad hominem: "Because of judging our faces, people know, that talking heads often demonise the ghetto-dwellers, each time it blows up they say it's us, I put a price on the head of the one who silences this asshole Éric Zemmour". The rapper had clarified in a previous interview in the newspaper Le Parisien that he was not advocating silencing Zemmour by force, but rather by argument. The album was finally released on 12 October 2009, with an expurgated version of the controversial track in which Zemmour's name is scrambled out. On 26 October 2011, Zemmour won his suit against the rapper and the director general of EMI Music France, Valérie Queinnec.

On 5 March 2011, some voices were raised against Zemmour and called for Rémy Pflimlin, the CEO of France Télévisions, to suspend Zemmour's collaboration with France 2, which he refused to do, explaining: ""The public service is attached to humanist and republican values, but it is also the place where the diversity of opinions is expressed within the legal framework", he reminds those around him urging him to suspend Éric Zemmour's collaboration with France 2".

On 17 November 2015, four days after the 13 November 2015 Paris terrorist attacks, Zemmour stated on RTL: "Instead of bombing Raqqa, France should bomb Molenbeek from which the Friday 13 commandos came". This caused outrage in Belgium. In a 24 March 2016 column, Zemmour added: "Molenbeeks, France is full of them. France creates them in abundance".

On 18 September 2018, controversy arose over his opinion about the first name of columnist Hapsatou Sy on the TV programme Les terriens du dimanche hosted by Thierry Ardisson. His words "It's your first name that is an insult to France", adding "first names embody the history of France" were cut at the editing of the show but rebroadcast by Sy. She then asked him "What would you like my name to be?" to which he answered "Corinne, that would suit you very well". She decided to file a complaint against Zemmour.

In 2020, whilst commenting on footage that showed four policemen hitting a black man in Paris, Zemmour responded to accusations of racism levelled at the involved policemen by saying "I can hardly see [them] getting up in the morning and telling themselves: 'Here, I'm going to endanger my career and I'm going to hit a black guy'", although he recognised "that does not mean that they were right" to do what they did. He also questioned the victim's judicial history.

In September 2021, in his book La France n'a pas dit son dernier mot, Zemmour states Seine-Saint-Denis—the northern suburbs of Paris known for their large Muslim population—has become a "foreign enclave under the reign of Allah", a remark which angered local politicians.

On 11 September 2021, Zemmour's declaration about the 2012 Toulouse and Montauban shootings caused controversy among Jewish communities in France.

Remarks about Vichy France's treatment of Jews 

Zemmour generated controversy by claiming that "Vichy [France] protected French Jews and gave the foreign Jews [to the Nazis]" in an interview with CNews. His statements in the interview polarized the French Jewish community, and were criticized by many Jewish leaders and intellectuals. In response to Zemmour's comment, the chief rabbi of France, Haïm Korsia, called Zemmour an antisemite and a racist.

Accusations of sexual harassment 
In May 2021, Zemmour was publicly accused of inappropriate sexual behaviour by several women, but no judicial proceedings followed.

Wikipedia page manipulation 

In February 2022, a shadow group working covertly within the digital division of Zemmour's campaign team was organized to alter articles at Wikipedia in order to promote Zemmour's profile. This "WikiZedia" team was discovered, and administrators at French Wikipedia banned seven editors, including a 15-year veteran who was one of the top contributors.

Legal cases
As of 2022, Zemmour has been convicted once in France for provoking racial discrimination in 2011, and once for hatred against Muslims in 2018 as well as once for inciting racial hatred for 2022. He did not appeal his 2011 conviction, but appealed on 5 December 2019 the 2018 conviction to the European Court of Human Rights on the basis of article 10 of the European Convention on Human Rights protecting freedom of expression. The ECHR upheld his conviction.

Convictions

2010: Incitement of racial discrimination 
The International League against Racism and Anti-Semitism (LICRA) decided to launch legal proceedings against Éric Zemmour for his views after the 6 March 2010 broadcast of Salut les Terriens presented by Thierry Ardisson, where he promoted his book Mélancolie française. He declared during the show that: "French people with an immigrant background were profiled because most traffickers are Blacks and Arabs. ... It is a fact." The same day, he asserted on France Ô that employers "had the right to refuse Arabs or blacks".
On 23 March 2010, he wrote a letter to the LICRA explaining his views. In this letter he particularly observed the views of Christian Delorme before a parliamentary commission of the Senate. He cited the book L'Islam dans les prisons by Farhad Khosrokhavar, who confirmed the figure of 70 or 80% of "Muslims in prison" estimated in a survey commissioned by the Ministry of Justice.
Following this letter, the International League against Racism and Anti-Semitism (LICRA) decided to withdraw its legal proceedings against Éric Zemmour.

On 30 March 2010, Éric Zemmour was summoned by SOS Racisme to appear in court on 29 June 2010, where he "will have to answer for the offense of racial defamation and incitement to racial hatred."  During the trial, Zemmour received testimony in his favour from journalist Robert Ménard, his fellow columnist Éric Naulleau, writer Denis Tillinac, politician Claude Goasguen and essayist Xavier Raufer.

On 18 February 2011, in a first judgment, the 17th chamber of the court of Paris acquitted Zemmour of the offense of defamation for the remarks on the traffickers.  These words may be "shocking", writes the court, but they are not "defamatory". On the other hand, he was condemned to a 1,000 euros fine suspended for having, on France Ô, "justified an illegal discriminatory practice – discrimination in hiring – by presenting it as lawful".  In a second judgment, the 17th chamber only retained the offense of incitement of racial discrimination and sentenced Zemmour to a suspended fine of 1,000 euros.

On 2 March 2011, invited by Hervé Novelli and given an ovation by the members of Parliament from the Union for a Popular Movement at the national convention of The Reformers, Zemmour suggested doing away with the laws on racial discrimination, the memorial laws, prosecutions by anti-racist organisations and subsidies to them in a speech to UMP members of Parliament.

2018: Incitement of religious hatred towards Muslims 
In the 6 September 2016 episode of the programme C à vous on France 5, while promoting the launch of his book Un quinquennat pour rien, Zemmour stated that Muslims should be given the choice "between Islam and France" and that "all Muslims, whether they say it or not", consider jihadists to be "good Muslims". On the 3 May 2018, the Court of appeal reckoned that these passages do not contain "any exhortation, even implicit, to incitement of hatred". On the other hand, the court of law did condemn him to a 5,000 euro fine for incitement to religious hatred, as well as to pay one euro in damages to the association Coordination des appels pour une paix juste au Proche-Orient - EuroPalestine and 3,000 euros for the legal costs. The court considered Zemmour's statements to "aim at Muslims in their entirety and constitued an implicit exhortation to discrimination", when he claimed that France had been experiencing "an invasion for thirty years" and that a "struggle to Islamise a territory" was taking place "in the countless French banlieus where many young women are veiled", "a jihad".

On the 17 September 2019, the Cour de cassation, bringing against him the charges of "an implicit exhortation to discrimination" and "a call for discrimination", rejected his appeal, making his condamnation on appeal definitive in domestic law.

However, on 5 December 2019, Zemmour complained to the European Court of Human Rights on the basis of article 10 of the European Convention on Human Rights which protects freedom of expression. His appeal was subsequently rejected by the EHCR in December 2022. In it's ruling the court said that Zemmour had "duties and responsibilities" as a journalist and was aware of the scope and consequences of his words on a television program. It also said that he sought to "stoke a rift between the French and the Muslim community as a whole,"

2022: Inciting racial hatred 
On the 17 January 2022, Zemmour was found guilty by a Paris court for inciting racial hatred during a TV programme on the French channel CNews in September 2020. He was fined €10,000  for comments about child migrants.

Acquittals 
He was acquitted six times of similar charges, in 2008, 2014 (twice), 2016, 2017 and 2019. Convictions in 2015 and 2020 were overturned on appeal.

2008: Legal case related to his novel 
In 2008, following the publication of his novel Petit Frère, in which a Jew is attacked by a young North African in a parking lot, Zemmour admits to having been inspired by a news item that occurred five years earlier: the murder of Sébastien Selam by Adel Amastaibou. Selam was a childhood friend and next door neighbour of Amastaibou. Zemmour was sued by the family of Selam who demanded the book be banned. According to the family lawyer, in the novel, the victim is described as a "bad Jew, his mother defamed and his grandfather accused of the worst evils". Zemmour won the case.

2014: Alleged Incitement of racial hatred 
The Representative Council of Black Associations (CRAN) filed a complaint with the Superior Audiovisual Council (CSA) about a column by Zemmour aired on 6 May 2014 on RTL.  As a result, CSA "strongly warned" RTL on 17 June, judging that Zemmour's remarks "were likely to encourage discriminatory behavior towards the population groups specifically named, and to be capable of inciting hatred or violence against them". The comments by Zemmour that were the subject of the complaint were these:

The CSA also considered that RTL, "by allowing the broadcasting of these remarks, had failed in their obligation to maintain control of the broadcast", recalling that the column had been communicated to station managers beforehand by its author. The Court of Appeal confirmed the acquittal on 22 June 2016.

2014: Remarks about Muslims 
On 30 October 2014, he told the Italian newspaper Corriere della Sera: "Muslims have their civil code, it is the Koran. They live among themselves, in the outskirts. The French were forced to leave". The journalist then asks him: "But don't you think that it is unrealistic to think that we take millions of people, we put them on planes to get rid of them?" Zemmour replied, "I know, it's unrealistic, but the story is surprising. Who would have said in 1940 that a million pieds-noirs, twenty years later, would have left Algeria to return to France? Or that after the war five or six million Germans would have abandoned central and eastern Europe where they had lived for centuries?" On 17 December 2015, Zemmour was sentenced at first instance to a fine of €3,000, for inciting hatred against Muslims. The conviction was confirmed by the Paris Court of Appeal on 17 November. In January 2018, the Cour de Cassation overturned the conviction. Zemmour was released on 29 November 2018, by the Paris Court of Appeal, the judges considering that "it is not proven that Eric Zemmour, prosecuted as an interviewee, knew that this newspaper was published in France".

2016: Defamation on Cécile Duflot 
On 12 May 2016, Zemmour declared on RTL that by publishing Denis Baupin's telephone exchanges, "Mediapart violated all the rules of respect for private life" and that these journalists are "also and above all the consenting instruments of Cécile Duflot's political revenge against Emmanuelle Cosse, Denis Baupin's companion, who betrayed her for a ministerial dish of lentils". Zemmour was sued for defamation by Duflot, but on 6 February 2018, the Paris Criminal Court released him, finding that his allegations against Cécile Duflot were not defamatory.

2017: Sanctions imposed by media watchdog agency canceled 
On 2 February 2017, Zemmour declared on RTL: "Non-discrimination is misrepresented as a synonym of equality whereas over time it has become a machine to disintegrate the Nation, the family, society in the name of the rights of an individual king". On 14 June 2017, RTL was put on formal notice by the High Audiovisual Council (CSA), France's media watchdog agency, for having broadcast "praise of discrimination" without any "contradiction or putting into perspective". On 15 October 2018, the Conseil d'Etat cancelled the decision of the CSA.

Pending court ruling

2019: Alleged Incitement to hatred of Muslims 
On 25 September 2020, the Paris court sentenced Zemmour to a fine of 10,000 euros for "insult and incitement to hatred", because of the comments he had made in September 2019 during a speech to the against Muslims and immigration, at the opening of the right-wing convention organised by relatives of Marion Maréchal. In its judgment, the court said that, "by distinguishing among the French all the Muslims opposed to the 'ethnic French' and by designating them, as well as the Muslim immigrants living in France, not only as criminals perpetrators of the terrorist attacks of 2015 but like former colonized people who became colonizers", the remarks made "constitute an exhortation, sometimes implicit and sometimes explicit, to discrimination and hatred towards the Muslim community and its religion".

Zemmour appealed. The appeal hearing took place on 2 June 2021. The Paris Court of Appeal acquitted him on 8 September 2021. In the reasons for its judgment, the court of appeal ruled that "none of the statements pursued target all Africans, immigrants or Muslims but only fractions of these groups". "There is no justification for remarks targeting a group of people as a whole because of their origin or their belonging or not belonging to a particular ethnicity, nation, race or religion," the court added, "from where it follows that the prosecuted offenses are not constituted."
The general prosecutor's office has filed a cassation appeal, which is pending.

Prizes 
2010 Prix de la Liberté d'expression (Enquête & Débat)
2010 Prix du livre incorrect
2011 Prix Richelieu (Association de Défense de la langue française)
2015 Prix Combourg-Chateaubriand (Académie Chateaubriand)

Publications

Non-fiction 
1995: Balladur, immobile à grands pas, Grasset 
1998: Le Livre noir de la droite, Grasset et Fasquelle 
1998: Le Coup d'État des juges, Grasset et Fasquelle 
1998: Une certaine idée de la France, collectif, France-Empire 
2000: Les Rats de garde, in collaboration with Patrick Poivre d'Arvor, Stock 
2002: L'Homme qui ne s'aimait pas, Balland 
2006: Le premier sexe, Denoël,  – republished J'ai lu, 2009
2010: Mélancolie française, Fayard /Denoël  – republished Le Livre de Poche, 2011.
2011: Z comme Zemmour, Le Cherche midi 
2012: Le Bûcher des vaniteux, Albin Michel 
2013: Le Bûcher des vaniteux 2, Albin Michel 
2014: Le Suicide français, Albin Michel 
2016: Un quinquennat pour rien, Albin Michel 
2018: Destin français, Albin Michel 
2021: La France n'a pas dit son dernier mot, Rubempré  (translation of title: France has not said its last word)

Novels 
1999: Le Dandy rouge, Plon 
2004: L'Autre, Denoël 
2008: Petit Frère, Denoël  – republished J'ai lu, 2009

Notes

References

Further reading 

 
 Chems-Eddine Hafiz, De quoi Zemmour est devenu le nom, Éditions du Moment, Paris, 2010, page 128 
 
 Mohamed Sifaoui, Éric Zemmour, une supercherie française, Armand Colin, Paris, 2010, pages 251 
 Shlomo Sand, The End of the French Intellectual, a critique of three French intellectuals including Zemmour

External links 
 
 
 Selection of videos of Zemmour

 
1958 births
Living people
French politicians
Candidates in the 2022 French presidential election
French political commentators
French Jews
Berber Jews
Gaullism
Conservatism in France
People from Montreuil, Seine-Saint-Denis
French journalists
French political writers
20th-century French Jews
French people of Algerian-Berber descent
French people of Algerian-Jewish descent
Sciences Po alumni
French columnists
Right-wing populism in France
Male critics of feminism
French critics of Islam
French male non-fiction writers
French conspiracy theorists
Le Figaro people
Reconquête politicians
French political party founders
Far-right politicians in France